Liam Maxwell (born June 1968) is a British technology executive and public servant. From April 2016 to August 2018 he was the UK's first National Technology Adviser, having been the UK's first Chief Technology Officer (CTO), as part of the Government Digital Service.

Government career 
Maxwell was a technology policy adviser to the Conservative Party in the run-up to the general election in 2010, helping write their manifesto, and following the election he started advising the new coalition administration. In June 2011, Maxwell formally joined the government, taking an apolitical civil service position as Director of "ICT futures" in the Cabinet Office under John Suffolk as Government Chief Information Officer and Ian Watmore as Chief Operating Officer of the Efficiency and Reform Group.

In 2012, Maxwell was appointed the new deputy government CIO, following Bill McCluggage's departure, now working under Andy Nelson. In December 2012, the remaining IT functions in the ERG were merged with the parallel Government Digital Service. As part of this, Maxwell became the UK Government's Chief Technology Officer; the rôle of Government Chief Information Officer was not transferred. 

During his time in GDS, Maxwell established the Digital 5 group of the world's five leading digitally advanced governments, reformed technology spending controls under the "Technology Code of Practice", and led the Public Services Network, Crown Hosting Service and Digital Marketplace programmes. In 2014, he committed to staying in the rôle of CTO until at least 2018.

In April 2016, it was announced by the Cabinet Office that Maxwell would take on the new position of National Technology Adviser to Matt Hancock, Minister for the Cabinet Office and Ed Vaizey, Minister for the Digital Economy at the Department for Culture, Media and Sport. He left the post in August 2018 to take a job at Amazon

References 

Chief technology officers
Living people
Place of birth missing (living people)
1968 births

Corruption